Adi Dravida (or Adi Dravidar) is a term that has been used since 1914 by the state of Tamil Nadu in India to denote Paraiyars. At the time of the 2011 Census of India, they made up about half of Tamil Nadu's Scheduled Caste population.

Origin 
Iyothee Thass, a leader of the  Paraiyar community, believed that the term "Paraiyar" was a slur. He attempted a reconstruction of Tamil history, arguing that the Paraiyars were the original inhabitants of the land, who had been subjugated by upper-caste invaders.  Another Paraiyar leader, Rettamalai Srinivasan, however, advocated using the term "Paraiyar" with pride, and formed the Parayar Mahajana Sabha ("Paraiyar Mahajana Assembly") in 1892. Thass, on the other hand, advocated the term "Adi-Dravida" ("Original Dravidians") to describe the community. In 1892, he used the term Adidravida Jana Sabhai to describe an organisation, which was probably Srinivasan's Parayar Mahajana Sabha. In 1895, he established the "People’s Assembly of Urdravidians" (Adidravida Jana Sabha), which probably split off from Srinivasan's organisation. According to Michael Bergunder, Thass was thus the first person to introduce the concept of "Adi Dravida" into political discussion.

In 1918, the Adi Dravida Mahajan Sabha also requested the Indian government use the term to replace the current but pejorative term "Pariah" (Paraiyar) used for the community.

Another Paraiyar leader, M C Rajah — a Madras councillor — made successful efforts for adoption of the term "Adi-Dravidar" in the government records. In 1914, the Madras Legislative Council passed a resolution that officially censured the usage of the term "Paraiyar" to refer to a specific community, and recommended "Adi Dravidar" as an alternative. In the 1920s and 1930s, Periyar ensured the wider dissemination of the term "Adi Dravida".

Reservation 
In South India, Adi Dravida are considered as Scheduled Castes, under India's positive system of Reservation.

References
Citations

Bibliography

 
 

Tamil society
Dalit communities
Scheduled Castes of Kerala
Scheduled Castes of Tamil Nadu
Scheduled Castes of Karnataka
Scheduled Castes of Andhra Pradesh
Scheduled Castes of Telangana